Personality is a 1930 American comedy film directed by Victor Heerman and starring Sally Starr, Johnny Arthur and Blanche Friderici.

Cast
 Sally Starr as Lil Morse 
 Johnny Arthur as Sandy Jenkins 
 Blanche Friderici as Ma 
 Frank Hammond as Pa 
 Buck Black as Junior 
 Lee Kohlmar as Mr. Himmelschlosser 
 John T. Murray as Mr. Keller 
 Vivien Oakland as Mrs. Keller 
 George C. Pearce as Mr. Abbott

References

Bibliography
 Larry Langman & Ronald H. Miller. A guide to American film directors: the sound era, 1929-1979. Scarecrow Press, 1981.

External links
 

1930 films
1930 comedy films
1930s English-language films
American comedy films
Films directed by Victor Heerman
Columbia Pictures films
1930s American films